Aki Takejo (4 April 1947 – 15 December 2022) was a Japanese actress and comedian.

Life and career 
Born in Yonezawa, Yamagata, after her high school graduation Takejo started her career as a dancer, first working in Osaka and later in Tokyo, where she began her acting career. She made her acting debut on stage in 1974. Well-known for her characteristic Yamagata dialect, beyond her career in films, stage plays and television dramas she was also very active as a comedian and had a busy career in variety shows. 

Takejo died after a two-years-battle against colorectal cancer on 15 December 2022, at the age of 75.

References

External links
 

1947 births
2022 deaths
Japanese television actresses
Japanese stage actresses
Japanese film actresses
People from Yamagata Prefecture
Japanese women comedians
Deaths from colorectal cancer